People's Congress may refer to:
 All People's Congress, political party in Sierra Leone
 Goa People's Congress, splinter group of the Indian National Congress in Goa
 Indian People's Congress, political party in India
 National People's Congress, the sole legislative chamber in the People's Republic of China
 There are also "local People's Congresses" in the provinces and cities
 People's Congress of Kyrgyzstan, electoral alliance in Kyrgyzstan
 People's Congress Party, political party in Solomon Islands
 Uganda People's Congress, political party in Uganda

See also 
 Basic People's Congress (disambiguation)
 General People's Congress (disambiguation)